Weedville may refer to:

 Weedville, Alabama, an alternate name for Weed Crossroad, a populated place in Crenshaw County, Alabama, United States
 Weedville, Arizona, a populated place in Maricopa County, Arizonea, United States
 Weedville, Pennsylvania, a CDP in Elk County, Pennsylvania, United States